Special Delivery (1997) is a romantic novel written by Danielle Steel.

Plot summary
Danielle Steel explores finding love when, and from whom you least expect it in Special Delivery. Jack Watson was a man hardened to the idea of love. The death of his one true love followed by a messy divorce led him content to lead the ultimate bachelor's life. Written about in the society pages, and despite his reputation, he never had trouble finding a date. It didn't hurt that he owned one of the most successful women's boutiques in Beverly Hills.
Amanda Robbins was a successful actress who had already claimed an Academy Award when she met her husband Matthew Kingston and fell in love. Amanda gave up her acting career to be a devoted mother of two children. Her husband Matthew wasn't interested in a working wife and Amanda was happy to oblige, until his sudden death from a heart attack. With the center of her life suddenly gone Amanda fell into despair and depression.

Jack and Amanda didn't travel in the same social circles however, the marriage of their children, Paul and Jan, created an undeniable connection. In the past, while Jack and Amanda were cordial with one another they didn't go out of their way to spend much time together.  One day Jan offers to take Amanda to one of Jack's infamous parties. Amanda surprises herself when she accepts and has a great time. This sparked a new beginning as she and Jack began spending more time together, initially just to talk about their children. However, they soon discover that they have more than just children in common. This new relationship helps Amanda heal from the loss of her husband and causes Jack to realize that life isn't as fulfilling when alone. An unexpected pregnancy nearly destroys their love, but ultimately brings them closer together. They end up seeing this new life as an opportunity to support Jan and Paul who have had trouble conceiving. At the last moment Jan finds out she's pregnant and have decided not to adopt Amanda and Jack's baby.

Interwoven throughout Special Delivery are the stories of family challenges for both the Robbin's and the Kingston's. Tension between Amanda's daughters, the difficulties of starting a family, and healing from the loss are all included as we watch Jack and Amanda fall in love with each other and learn how to make both of their families stronger in times of need.

Major characters
Jack Watson: Owner of Julie's one of the hottest clothing Boutique's in Beverly Hills. He enjoys life as the ultimate Beverly Hills bachelor to the chagrin of his two children Paul and Julie.
Amanda Kingston, née Robbins: After 25 years of marriage she is now the depressed widow of Matthew Kingston with whom she raised two daughters, Jan & Louise. Amanda was a former actress who has been out of the “scene” for years although she is still widely recognized from early awards.
Paul Watson: Jack's oldest son, involved in movie production. He married Amanda's oldest daughter Jan and disapproves of his father's chosen life style.
Jan Watson, née Kingston: She wants to start a family but has had trouble conceiving and is worried she isn't physically able. She is very close to her mother and is often at odds with her sister Lou.
Julie: Jack's daughter sympathetic to Amanda and Jack's relationship.
Louise (Lou): Amanda's oldest daughter who is married to Jerry and has children. She has always fought with her sister and had a tenuous relationship with her father.

Major themes

Love doesn't have an expiration date

This novel focuses on the idea that love doesn't have an expiration date. Many people believe that they are only able to find one true love, once. This novel takes into consideration that love can come around multiple times.  
Jack and Amanda both believe that for whatever reason they've run out of time on love. Jack has written off love after bad experiences, figuring that he missed his chance. Amanda believes that her 25-year relationship with her husband was the only love she would ever experience. However, they both discovered quickly that they had the opportunity to find happiness again in each other.

Grief and mourning and swearing off relationships

A central theme of all romance novels is the idea that the protagonist have given up on the idea of love. They have determined that for what ever reason they are destined to be alone. It is at the very moment that they make this pack with themselves that they meet someone with the potential to be “the one.”  Romance novels also explore some element of grief/mourning. The main characters are often just coming off of some disaster and are attempting to move on by swearing off love and focusing on themselves.

Jack and Amanda are both grieving over the loss of love. Jack is still grieving for the love he feels he was never able to completely experience. Amanda is grieving the recent death of her husband. Neither expects to find that same level of connection, companionship, or comfort that they found in past partners. In the past, Amanda and Jack had more of a compulsory relationship because their children had married. However, they both discover that they had more in common than just their children. The time that they spent together helped them both overcome the loss of past loves as they find a new love in each other.

Exploring a physical relationship

A basic element of all romantic novels is when the main characters explore a physical relationship. This exploration usual marks the point in the characters relationship when they have let down their emotional barriers and are ready to admit some sort of feelings for the other person. The first intimate contact also indicates how physically attracted they are to each other. The characters must be physically attracted to each other to ensure a successful match. 
Amanda and Jack spent a lot of time building up to their first physical contact. The moment that Jack tells Amanda he loves her and wants to make love to her, he is acknowledging how much she means to him. Hearing him admit his feelings made it easier for Amanda to let her own walls down and admit to herself that she was also in love with him. Even though afterward she freaked out for a moment she was quick to recover and spend some more intimate time together. In addition to signifying that they are emotionally attached the success of their relationship is nearly secured once they both see that they are physically attracted to each other.

Key Quotes

Budding Friendship

In the beginning Jack and Amanda got along for the sake of their children, but did not particularly enjoy each other's company. These quotes highlight the shift in the mind-set of Amanda as she realizes there's more to Jack than she originally thought. This is the beginning of a true friendship between Jack and Amanda that exists beyond the relationships between their children.

"He was a womanizer certainly he made no secret of it, and yet there was far more to him than that. There was something oddly endearing about him, like a young boy gone wild, but with a look in his eyes that made you want to hug him."

"In spite of his reputation and the fact that she wasn’t ready for this, she really liked him. And he seemed to understand everything that she was feeling. There was a warm, caring side to him that had taken her by surprise and caught her off guard completely."

Fear of New Relationship/End of Mourning

At this point in the novel Amanda realizes she has come to the end of the mourning period for her deceased husband. She has begun to have feelings for Jack that are greater than friendship and the initial realization that she could love someone else after so long is terrifying. Jack also goes through a period of mourning his past love. Unlike Amanda he got through his mourning period by having a series of disposable relationships. After spending time with Amanda he also comes to the realization that he could and has fallen in love again.

"She cried for two men, one she had loved for so long, and the other she would never know. It was hard to tell at that exact moment which pain was greater, and which of them she most longed for."

"No I’m fine he lied. Except that I’ve wasted my life, the only woman I ever loved died thirteen years ago, and the best woman I’ve ever met before or since wants to bury herself with her husband."

First sex scene/Pronouncing of love

Jack and Amanda's relationship had been slowly growing from friendship to a deeper more intimate relationship. After spending days together they have built up such affection for one another it was only a matter of time before they end up taking their relationship to the next and most intimate level.

"It was ten o’clock by the time they were in front of the fire again, and he was kissing her, and she was returning his kisses with passion. He poured them each a glass of Champagne, and they drank it faster than they planned. In the warmth of the fire, and the glow of the Champagne, his kisses seemed headier than ever, and she had no idea what time it was when his deep, sexy voice told her that he loved her, and asked her to go to bed with him. She didn’t say anything. She only clung to him and nodded. She wanted him more than anything, and for once he couldn’t even make himself stop to wonder if she’d regret it. He wanted her too badly…. There was no regret and no reckoning. Until the next morning..."

The next morning Amanda is racked with guilt having slept with another man, not even a year after the death of her husband. She felt as though she was betraying her past relationship with Matthew and made it especially worse by sleeping with another man in the bed that she had shared with her late husband for 25 years.

"She was trying to make it right with herself, but he was only willing to go so far. He loved her too much now to lose any part of her, particularly parts he had discovered the previous evening."

Children Learn of Relationship

For the majority of the novel Jack and Amanda choose to keep their relationship a secret from their children. When they make the decision to unveil their love to their children it signifies how serious Jack and Amanda's relationship has become. To the shock of Amanda and Jack nearly all of their children react negatively to their announcement.
 
"This is an extremely rude thing to do,” Louise said with open fury, “to bring us here, to my father’s house to tell us that you two are having an affair. My God don’t you have any decency left Mom? What about Daddy?"

"Why can’t she be happy alone? Why can’t she just remember my father" (Jan)
"Because she’s a young, vital, beautiful woman, Jan. Why should she be alone? Is that what you would do if something happened to Paul?"
"That’s different."
"Why because you’re younger than we are? Even people our age have a right not to be alone, to companionship, to happiness to love." (Jack)

Reaction to Pregnancy

Jack and Amanda face an unplanned pregnancy that nearly destroys their relationship. Jack and Amanda both have grown children and the prospect of having another child is unacceptable to Jack, he refuses to even consider the idea. Amanda while shocked, is unwilling to terminate the pregnancy. The pregnancy drives a wedge between Jack and Amanda. Neither are unwilling to compromise on their beliefs about the pregnancy.

"Well you’re not going to keep the pregnancy at our age. That’s ridiculous. And besides neither of us wants more kids. What would we do with a baby?" (Jack)
"What does everyone else do?" (Amanda)
"They’re usually twenty years younger than we are and they’re married." And then as he looked at her face, he pulled over. "Are you telling me you want to keep it?" She didn’t answer him, but the look in her eyes filled him with terror. "Are you crazy? I’m sixty years old and you’re fifty-one. We’re not married and your children already hate me. How do you think this little piece of news would go over?" (Jack)

Reception
The novel was not well-received by critics.

References

1997 American novels
American romance novels
Novels by Danielle Steel
Delacorte Press books